General MacDowall, McDowall, or McDowell may refer to:

Charles McDowell (North Carolina militiaman) (1743–1815), North Carolina Militia brigadier general in the American Revolutionary War
David McDowall (born 1954), British Army major general
Day Hort MacDowall (British Army officer) (1795–1870), British Army lieutenant general
Hay MacDowall (died 1809), British Army lieutenant general
Irvin McDowell (1818–1885), U.S. Army major general

See also
Robert McDouall (1774–1848), British Army major general